Lester Afflick (1956 – January 2000) was a downtown New York City writer and poet.

Biography
Born in Kingston, Jamaica, in 1956, Afflick came to the United States with his family when he was 16 years old, and attended Brooklyn College. In New York, Afflick co-edited The Door Newsletter and contributed widely to the downtown poetry and literature scene. Afflick was featured in the 1979 Waterways: Poetry in the Mainstream festival and publications. He was also published in Box 749, a Magazine of Printable Arts. In 2008, a collection of his poetry was published by Fly By Night Press under the title I Dream About You Baby.

References

External links
 NYU's Fales Library Guide to the Lester Afflick Papers
 The Lester Afflick Papers are held at the Fales Library and Special Collections, New York University.
 
 Review of I Dream About You Baby, Small Press Distribution.

1956 births
2000 deaths
Poets from New York (state)
20th-century Jamaican poets
American male poets
Jamaican emigrants to the United States
20th-century American poets
Jamaican male poets
20th-century American male writers
Brooklyn College alumni